Pappano is a surname. Notable people with the surname include:

Antonio Pappano (born 1959), English-Italian conductor and pianist
Lenny Pappano (born 1964), American fantasy sports writer